The Vegan Society is a registered charity and the oldest vegan organization in the world, founded in the United Kingdom in 1944 by Donald Watson, Elsie Shrigley, George Henderson and his wife Fay Henderson among others.

History

In November, 1944 Donald Watson secretary of the Leicester Vegetarian Society who identified as a non-dairy vegetarian started a newsletter The Vegan News, sub-titled "Quarterly Magazine of the Non-Dairy Vegetarians". Watson coined the term vegan to describe a vegetarian diet devoid of all animal-derived ingredients such as dairy and eggs. He derived the term from the word vegetarian by taking its first three letters and its last two letters because "veganism starts with vegetarianism and carries it through to its logical conclusion". However, Watson credited founding members G. A. Henderson and his wife Fay K. Henderson as originating the idea of the word vegan as they had suggested the name 'Allvega' with 'Allvegan' to be used as the title of his magazine. It was from this that the term vegan was taken by Watson. 

Watson had given a talk to the Vegetarian Society on the use of dairy products in December, 1943 and a summary was published in their journal,
The Vegetarian Messenger in March, 1944. A few months later Watson and Shrigley requested to form a sub-group of non-dairy vegetarians within the Vegetarian Society. There were arguments from vegetarians against the formation of a non-dairy group within its organization. It was considered but its trustees felt that its inclusion might not be comfortable for its vegetarian membership and it was suggested that the non-dairy vegetarians should form their own society. In November 1944, Watson, Elsie Shrigley, the Henderson's and others met at the Attic Club in Holborn, London to discuss the formation of The Vegan Society. According to Shrigley, the day of the founding meeting was "a Sunday, with sunshine and a blue sky – an auspicious day for the birth of an idealistic movement". During the same month, The Vegan Society published their manifesto with two aims:

1. To advocate that man's food should be derived from fruits, nuts, vegetables, grains and other wholesome non-animal products and that it should exclude flesh, fish, fowl, eggs, honey, and animal's milk, butter, and cheese.
2. To encourage the manufacture and use of alternatives to animal commodities.

When The Vegan Society was being formed, Watson's newsletter was sent to 500 readers, and its successor, The Vegan first published in 1946, ran to a 
thousand copies.

Definition

In 1945, Watson and committee members of The Vegan Society defined veganism as "the practice of living on fruits, nuts, vegetables, grains, and other wholesome non-animal products". Writing in 1947, Fay K. Henderson commented that There has been much conjecture as to the origin of the word VEGAN and its meaning. It is therefore interesting to realise that in the first instance it was an attempt to get beyond the rather negative phrase "non-dairy vegetarian" which was originally applied to the founders of The Vegan Society. The word indicates an all vegetable base and is a restricted form of vegetarian, being both the beginning and the end yet implying hopefully that what starts as vegetarian may finish as vegan.

The definition of veganism was amended over the years into a philosophy. The Vegan Society now defines veganism as "a philosophy and way of living which seeks to exclude—as far as is possible and practicable—all forms of exploitation of, and cruelty to, animals for food, clothing or any other purpose; and by extension, promotes the development and use of animal-free alternatives for the benefit of humans, animals and the environment. In dietary terms it denotes the practice of dispensing with all products derived wholly or partly from animals."

Activities
 Information – The Vegan Society provides information on all aspects of vegan living on their website, from their nutritional pages such as Vitamin B12: the key facts to the how and why of going vegan, to lifestyle articles and blogs. Their 30 Day Vegan Pledge has been running since 2008, each day providing a recipe, tips, and advice on going vegan. The Vegan Society also offer tools for activists such as free leaflets and advice on effective outreach.
 Campaigns – The Vegan Society campaigns on multiple issues. Current campaigns involve improving hospital catering and their 'Grow Green' campaign, whereby farmers are incentivized to move from animal farming towards plant protein crops.
 Support – The Vegan Society provides support via its UK network of local contacts as well as a free email-in service.
 Vegan Trademark – the label ensures all products and its derivatives are free from animal ingredients and testing. The Vegan Society defines 'animal' as all vertebrates and invertebrates, meaning its policy does not allow testing on insects, water fleas or any other creature.
 The Vegan – the charity publishes a quarterly magazine sent free to members.
 Since June 2020, The Vegan Society has a podcast, called The Vegan Pod.

World Vegan Day
The founding of the society is celebrated annually on 1 November, World Vegan Day. The day was established in 1994 by Louise Wallis, the then president and chairperson; however, the actual date of founding was on 5 November 1944.

Controversy

In 2021, complaints were made against Eshe Kiama Zuri, former vice-chairperson of The Vegan Society, who made a series of controversial posts deemed offensive and racist on social media. In response, Zuri accused other members of The Vegan Society of being racist and homophobic. Zuri, who identifies as disabled and non-gendered, argued that although veganism was coined by a white man it had been built on indigenous and non-western ancestral traditions in Africa and Asia this was not being acknowledged by its members, and that they had been "forced out" of the Society by a smear campaign. 

The Vegan Society commissioned Ijeoma Omambala, QC, to investigate such claims. Omanbala in her report found that the complainants did not present any evidence to support the alleged claims of racism but that some of Zuri's posts had been unprofessional and inappropriate and noted that Zuri, who uses the pronouns 'they', had been misgendered 'she' in meetings at the Society. Zuri and four other trustees resigned prior to the completion of mediation. The Vegan Society have published a summary of Omambala's report on their website and have released a public statement claiming "as with many charities, The Vegan Society has a number of challenges that we must address as we evolve into an even more diverse and inclusive organisation."

Movement for Compassionate Living
A breakaway group from The Vegan Society, the Movement for Compassionate Living, was founded in 1984 by the former Vegan Society secretary Kathleen Jannaway and her husband Jack.

See also
 European Vegetarian Union
 List of vegetarian organizations
 List of animal rights groups

References

External links

First issue of "The Vegan News", the Vegan Society newsletter November 1944, Published and written by Donald Watson. Accessed August 2021

1944 establishments in the United Kingdom
Organisations based in Birmingham, West Midlands
Organizations established in 1944
Vegan organizations
Vegetarianism in the United Kingdom